Sooryavansham is a 1999 Indian Hindi-language romantic musical drama film directed by E. V. V. Satyanarayana. It stars Amitabh Bachchan in dual roles, with Soundarya, Jayasudha, Rachna Banerjee, Anupam Kher and Kader Khan. The film is a remake of the 1997 Tamil-language film Suryavamsam, and revolves around a traditional father and his illiterate yet obedient son, following their tense relationship and shows how the strict patriarchy causes a drift between them.

S. Gopal Reddy acted as the cinematographer, while Gautham Raju edited the film. Anu Malik composed the film's music, with lyrics penned by Sameer.

The film was opened to positive reviews towards the performance of Bachchan but ended up being a box-office bomb, grossing only . However, over the years, it has gathered cult following among the Indian diaspora, and has been telecasted frequently on the television channel SET Max.

Plot
The Sooryavansham family head - Thakur Bhanu Pratap Singh is the sarpanch of the village of Bharatpur. The people of Bharatpur respect and revere him for his blue blood and virtuous ideologies. Bhanupratap has done yeoman's service not only for the people of Bharatpur but also for those of the 18 neighbouring villages in the district. The local police and administration also obey his orders in the matters of law.

Bhanupratap lives in a grand mansion with his wife Sharda, three sons, Karan, Varun and Heera and daughter Urmila. One of his sons is an engineer, one is a doctor, while Heera, the youngest one, lives like a servant in the house because of his illiteracy, causing Bhanupratap to hate him. Heera is not allowed to be involved in familial matters and performs menial activities like cleaning, washing, herding cattle, etc. Although hated by Bhanupratap, Heera has intense love and respect for his father, making him an ideal and worthy son. Heera is only loved and cared for by Sharda and Heera's close friend Dharmendra/Mindra, one of the servants in the house.

Bhanupratap arranges the marriage of his daughter Urmila. A few days before the engagement ceremony, the groom comes to his house along with his uncle Ranjit Singh, a retired major, and sister Radha. Radha, a modern young woman, is unaware of Heera being Bhanupratap's son and makes Heera do various chores. On the day of the engagement, when Radha learns the truth from her father, she is shocked as well as touched. Subsequently, Radha develops an eagerness to know why Heera lives like a servant in his own house. Radha inquires Dharmendra about this. Dharmendra narrates Radha Heera's past:

During his childhood, although Heera attended school, Heera wasn't at all interested in studies and often failed his examinations. He used to go to school only to meet Gauri, the girl who was adopted by Bhanupratap after the demise of her parents. Gauri was more than just a friend to Heera. One day at school, a teacher thrashed Gauri, causing Heera to discontinue his academic studies. Gauri, however, continued her studies. Bhanupratap thought that Heera's company would hamper Gauri's studies and sent her to a boarding school in the city. Being separated from Gauri, Heera cheered up when Gauri came on weekends, during which the two met each other. Soon, Heera and Gauri attained adulthood. Bhanupratap planned Heera's marriage with Gauri. When Gauri learns about this, she attempted suicide but was timely rescued by Heera. Gauri told Heera that she preferred death to marriage with an illiterate man like him. Thus, their relationship ended. Bhanupratap, learning only half the truth, was filled with more hatred for Heera than ever. Later, Gauri was married off to another man while Heera continued to live a sad and miserable life. Radha, after listening to Heera's sad story, is overwhelmed with pity for Heera. On the day of Urmila's marriage, Radha proposes to Heera. Heera realizes that Radha is a loyal and virtuous woman and accepts her proposal of love.

Deshraj Thakur is another landowner in Bharatpur who schemes to devastate his enemy Bhanupratap and his family by making Radha his daughter-in-law. If Radha is married to Deshraj's son Arjun, Radha's lawyer father will do whatever Deshraj wants. In this way, he will be able to get ahead of Bhanu Pratap. Radha's mother approves of the alliance and asks Bhanupratap to make Heera move out of Radha's life. Bhanupratap does so, assuring Heera that he will get back his filial status in his family if he does so. Dharmendra convinces Heera to accept Radha as his wife, saying only a fortunate few find true love like Radha found. On the day of Radha's marriage to Arjun, Heera takes Radha away with him and marries her. This enrages Bhanupratap and he disowns Heera.

Heera and Radha move into Dharmendra's house on the outskirts of the village and start a new chapter in their lives. Heera gets a job as a laborer in a transport company. When Radha learns that her husband has been toiling to make both ends meet, she encourages him to start his own business. With the money lent by Ranjit, Heera establishes a transport company under the name of his father. Soon, Heera becomes a rich businessman while Radha successfully completes her I.A.S. studies and is appointed the District Collector in her home district. A son is also born to the couple. Despite knowing that Heera and his family have moved up the social strata, Thakur Bhanupratap continues to hate them. Heera fulfills his father's dream of setting up a hospital for the poor. In the ceremony of the hospital's inauguration, Heera delivers a highly emotional speech, owing his success to his father, who, he believes, has expelled him from home so that he learns to fend for himself. Bhanupratap overhears this.

One day, Bhanupratap incidentally meets Heera and Radha's son. After learning that the child is his grandson, Bhanupratap and his grandson secretly become friends and spend jovial moments with each other. When Heera soon learns about his, he hands some Kheer over to his son and tells him to give it to his "friend" (Bhanupratap) when he meets him next. Sharda also gets to know about it and urges her husband to accept Heera back into the family. Bhanupratap's love for Heera gets better of his hatred towards him, and he rings Heera up. Before Bhanupratap speaks a word to Heera over the phone, he vomits blood and becomes critically ill. Bhanupratap is immediately hospitalised and Deshraj publicly holds Heera guilty of trying to kill his father with the poisoned Kheer, because of his expulsion from the family. When Deshraj and his henchmen assault Heera, Thakur Bhanupratap arrives for Heera's rescue. Thakur Bhanupratap, before the crowd, lays bare the truth of the Kheer which was poisoned by Deshraj himself with artifice. Bhanupratap and Heera fight Deshraj and his henchmen until Deshraj confesses his guilt and begs pardon from Bhanupratap.

In the final scene, the kith and kin of Bhanupratap's family assemble in front of the family's grand mansion. Bhanupratap embraces Heera and the film ends.

Cast
 Amitabh Bachchan as Thakur Bhanupratap Singh / Heera Singh (Double Role)
 Jayasudha as Sharda Singh
 Soundarya as Radha Singh
 Anupam Kher as Dharmendra
 Kader Khan as Lieutenant Major Ranjeet Singh   
 Shivaji Satam as Radha's Father
 Bindu as Radha's Mother
 Mukesh Rishi as Deshraj Thakur / Kewda Thakur
 Imran Khan as Arjun Thakur
 Ahuti Prasad as Karan Singh 
 Rajesh Khattar as Baran Singh
 Neelima Azeem as Heera's second elder Sister-in-law
 Rachana Banerjee as Gauri
 Chalapathi Rao as Police Commissioner
 Brahmanandam as Doctor PK Mare
 Ananda Vardhan as Sonu
 Kallu Chidambaram as Bus service customer
 Ishaan Khatter as Atish Naran

Production
Before working in Hindi language films, Soundarya had acted in a total of 65 South Indian films. Her brother Amarnath, who managed her career, stated that she always performed decorous roles and same would be the case in Bollywood. Soundarya said that she was excited when a role in the film was offered to her and to have got an opportunity to co-star with Amitabh Bachchan. Having studied Sanskrit, the actress added, she was quite comfortable with Hindi, and could read and write it. She also asked the viewers to be optimistic about the film, although the actress was a bit dubious about her role.

Film's mahurat ceremony was attended by a number of celebrities from the Telugu cinema, including Nagarjuna and Venkatesh Daggubati. Rekha lent her voice for actresses Jayasudha and Soundarya.

Soundtrack 
The movie's music was composed by Anu Malik. The film score was composed by Koti. The tunes of all the songs of the film are different from those of their Tamil counterparts, except one- "Dil Mere Tu Deewana Hai". The songs were written by Sameer. The voices are of Kumar Sanu, Sonu Nigam, Chithra, Jaspinder Narula, Amitabh Bachchan (in the song "Chori Se Chori Se"), and Anuradha Paudwal. The song "Dil Mere Tu Deewana Hai" is portrayed in different tones – once in happy note and twice with forlorn touch. All the songs aptly relate the story through various phases.

Track list

Awards and nominations

Reception

Box office
In India, the film had box office collections of  nett and  gross. Overseas, the film collected $285,000, including £53,000 in the United Kingdom. Worldwide, the film grossed .

References

External links
 

Hindi remakes of Tamil films
1999 films
1990s Hindi-language films
Films directed by E. V. V. Satyanarayana
Films shot in Sri Lanka
Films shot in Gujarat
Films scored by Anu Malik
Films scored by Koti
Indian drama films